Anaru Iehu Ngawaka (1872–1964) was a New Zealand Te Rarawa leader and Anglican clergyman.

References

1872 births
1964 deaths
New Zealand Anglican priests
New Zealand Māori religious leaders
Te Rarawa people
People from the Northland Region